A statue of Christopher Columbus is installed in Boston's Beacon Hill neighborhood, within Louisburg Square, in the U.S. state of Massachusetts. A Greek merchant, Joseph Iasigi, presented the statue to the city in December 1849. A captain of one of his vessels had loaded it onto a ship in Italy as ballast, alongside a statue of Aristides which was also donated. Both statues are described as "inferior" and "unremarkable" by art critics. The Italian marble sculpture was carved in Leghorn and depicts Columbus as a boy.

References

External links
 

Beacon Hill, Boston
Beacon Hill, Boston
Marble sculptures in Massachusetts
Outdoor sculptures in Boston
Sculptures of men in Massachusetts
Statues in Boston